Racing Club Warwick Football Club is a football club based in Warwick, Warwickshire, and competes in the .

History

They were formed in 1919 under the name of Saltisford Rovers and played in various local leagues including the Warwick League, Leamington & District League and the Warwickshire Combination until 1967. During this period the club won a number of honours, including the Birmingham Alliance Senior Cup when they defeated Birmingham City in the final at St. Andrews. In 1967 the club joined the West Midlands (Regional) League.  Three years later they changed to their current name (which came from the fact that their ground is by Warwick Racecourse) and soon afterwards switched to the Midland Football Combination, where they were champions in 1988 and runners-up in 1989.  After the latter honour they gained promotion to the Southern League where they remained until 2003 when they finished bottom of the Western Division and dropped into the Midland Football Alliance. They remained in the Midland Football Alliance until the end of the 2008–09 season, when they were relegated to the Midland Football Combination Premier Division, now the Midland Football League Division One.  At the start of the 2016–17 season the club began huge infrastructure renovations following the arrival of local businessman Chairman Gary Vella and the new committee members the previous year, including new changing rooms, floodlighting, stands and artificial training area. The club's record win is 15–0 recorded on 26 December 2016.  They gained their first promotion for 30 years in 2018-19 as runners-up in the Midland Football League Division One.  The club installed a 3g pitch in the winter of 2020 in order to expand their community activity and provide a broad spectrum of football to include women's and disability amongst other community groups. A Soccersix league plays on Monday evenings and the West Midlands Ambulance Service will play their home fixtures at the ground.

Youth set-up and football academy

As of the 2022–23 season the club has a youth team in the Midland Floodlight Youth League, teams from U-8 to U-16 and an academy nursery section, Mini Racers, for children aged 4 to 7. The junior teams are entered into the Coventry Minor League, MJPL and the Mid Warwickshire league. Wildcats for Girls began in April 2021. The club also have an academy and education programme run by ex Coventry City Captain Carl Baker in partnership with HOET.

Players

First team squad

Backroom staff and club officials

Honours
 Warwick League Champions 1933–36 inclusive
 Warwick Cinderella Cup Winners 1935–39 inclusive, 1946–47
 T.G John Cup Winners 1936–37
 Leamington & District Champions 1937–38 and 1945–48 inclusive
 Birmingham & West Midlands Alliance Champions 1948–49
 Leamington Hospital Cup Winners 1938–39, 1946–47
 Leamington Junior Cup Winners 1938–39, 1946–47
 Birmingham & District Alliance Senior Cup Winners 1949–50
 Midland Combination Premier Division Champions 1987–88
 Midland Alliance League Cup Winners 2004–05 
 Midland Floodlit Youth League southern champions 2013–14

Club records
Best league performance: Southern League Midland Division, 10th, 1994–95
Best FA Cup performance: 3rd qualifying round, 1987–88
Best FA Trophy performance: 2nd round, 1998–99
Best FA Vase performance: 4th round, 1977–78
Biggest league win: 15–0 v Southam United, 26 December 2016
Most league goals scored in a season: 119, 2018–19
Record goalscorer in a season: Ben Mackey, 37 goals, 2018–19

Sources

References

External links
Club website

 
Midland Football Combination
Association football clubs established in 1919
Southern Football League clubs
Football clubs in Warwickshire
1919 establishments in England
Midland Football League
Warwick